Mecranium haitiense is a species of plant in the family Melastomataceae. It is an evergreen shrub found on the islands of Hispaniola and Cuba.

References 

Melastomataceae
Flora of Cuba
Flora of Haiti
Flora of the Dominican Republic
Flora without expected TNC conservation status